Melizzano is a comune (municipality) in the Province of Benevento in the Italian region Campania, located about 45 km northeast of Naples and about 25 km west of Benevento.

Melizzano borders the following municipalities: Amorosi, Castel Campagnano, Dugenta, Frasso Telesino, Solopaca, Telese Terme.

References

External links
 Official website

Cities and towns in Campania